The 2000 Welsh Cup Final saw Bangor City win the Welsh Cup after beating Cwmbran Town 1–0 at Racecourse Ground in the 113th Welsh Cup Final.

Route to the final

Wrexham

Swansea City

Match

Details 

Match rules
90 minutes
30 minutes of extra-time if necessary
Penalty shoot-out if scores still level
Three named substitutes
Maximum of three substitutions

References

Bibliography

Notes

External links 

RSSSF: Wales - List of Cup Finals
Welsh Football Data Archive: WELSH CUP 1895/96
Welsh Football Data Archive: WELSH CUP FINAL 1999/2000
Welsh Football Data Archive: Welsh Cup Final 1999/2000

2000
Finals
Welsh Cup Final 2000